Giroud is a French surname. Notable people with the surname include:

 Alberto Bayo y Giroud (1892–1967), Cuban military leader and writer
 Françoise Giroud (1916–2003), French journalist, screenwriter, writer and politician
 Frank Giroud (1956–2018), French comics writer
 Jean-Pierre Giroud (born 1938), French geotechnical engineer and geosynthetics pioneer
 Olivier Giroud (born 1986), French footballer
 Pavel Giroud (born 1973), Cuban film director
 Thibault Giroud (born 1974), French rugby union coach

See also
 Fort de Pré-Giroud, twentieth-century Swiss fortification located in the Jura Mountains
 Giroux, a similar surname

French-language surnames